Anders Bergström (born 4 September 1968 in Los, Hälsingland) is a Swedish cross-country skier who competed from 1989 to 2003. Competing in two Winter Olympics, his best career finish was sixth in the 4 × 10 km relay at Lillehammer in 1994 while his best individual finish was 22nd in the 30 km event at the same olympics.

Bergström's best finish at the FIS Nordic World Ski Championships was sixth twice in the 30 km event (1997, 1999). His only World Cup victory was in a 30 km event in Sweden in 1999.

Cross-country skiing results
All results are sourced from the International Ski Federation (FIS).

Olympic Games

World Championships

World Cup

Season standings

Individual podiums
 1 victory 
 4 podiums

Team podiums
 2 victories 
 11 podiums

References

External links

 
Olympic 4 x 10 km relay results: 1936-2002 

1968 births
Living people
People from Ljusdal Municipality
Cross-country skiers from Gävleborg County
Cross-country skiers at the 1992 Winter Olympics
Cross-country skiers at the 1994 Winter Olympics
Cross-country skiers at the 1998 Winter Olympics
Swedish male cross-country skiers
Olympic cross-country skiers of Sweden